The 609th Special Operations Squadron is an inactive United States Air Force unit.  Its last assignment was with the 56th Special Operations Wing  at Nakhon Phanom Royal Thai Navy Base, Thailand.  The squadron served for two and a half years combat duty during the Vietnam War, primarily flying missions over the Ho Chi Minh Trail in Laos. It earned several decorations, including the Presidential Unit Citation, before it was inactivated in December 1969.

The first predecessor of the squadron was the 349th Night Fighter Squadron, which served as a night fighter training unit in Florida and California until it was disbanded in a reorganization of Army Air Forces training units and replaced by the 450th AAF Base Unit.

The second predecessor of the 609th was the 329th Transport Squadron, which was organized overseas to provide airlift services in the Mediterranean Theater of Operations

History

Night fighter training

The 349th Night Fighter Squadron was formed at Orlando Army Air Base, Florida in October 1942 as part of the Army Air Force School of Applied Tactics Fighter Command School from elements of the 81st Fighter Squadron. Its personnel were veteran American pilots trained by the Royal Air Force in night interception operations. It was initially equipped with three Douglas DB-7s and twenty-three Douglas P-70s. Shortages in operational flying aircraft, spare parts and other issues kept flying training very rudimentary for the squadron's first classes that graduated in December 1942.

As 1943 progressed additional aircraft and equipment arrived and the program expanded.   In September, the first American-built dedicated night fighter began to arrive, the YP-61, and a few production Northrop P-61A Black Widows. In January 1944 the entire night fighter training program moved to Hammer Field, California and was placed under IV Fighter Command.  The move placed the squadron nearer to Northrop Aircraft manufacturing facility at Hawthorne, California.  Most P-61 squadrons trained by the squadron were planned to deploy for operations in the Pacific and China Burma India Theaters.

In March 1944 the 348th was disbanded when the AAF found that standard military units, based on relatively inflexible tables of organization were proving less well adapted to the training mission.  Accordingly, a more functional system was adopted in which each base was organized into a separate numbered unit during a reorganization of units in the United States.  The squadron's personnel and equipment were transferred to Squadron B of the 450th Army Air Forces Base Unit (Night Fighter Replacement Training Unit).

Airlift in the Mediterranean Theater
The 329th Transport Squadron delivered cargo and mail throughout the Mediterranean Theater of Operations from its activation in March 1944 until it was inactivated in September 1945.  The squadron was disbanded in 1948, then reconstituted in 1985 and consolidated with the 609th.

Combat Operations During the Vietnam War

The 609th Special Operations Squadron was organized as the 609th Air Commando Squadron at Nakhon Phanom RTAFB, Thailand on 15 September 1967. It was assigned to the 56th Air Commando Wing.  The squadron flew the Douglas A-26 Invader, a twin engine attack bomber of WWII vintage.  These aircraft were transferred from the 606th Air Commando Squadron which transitioned to other aircraft.  The primary mission of the 609th was night interdiction of truck traffic along the Ho Chi Minh Trail. Its call sign for these missions was "Nimrod", inherited from the 606th and other squadrons that had flown that mission, and "The Nimrods" soon became the squadron's nickname.  The squadron's A-26 aircraft carried tail letters "TA".

On 1 August 1968, all Air Commando Wings were redesignated as Special Operations Units, and the 56th Air Commando Wing became the 56th Special Operations Wing, with the 609th Air Commando Squadron becoming the 609th Special Operations Squadron.

The night interdiction tasks of the 609th were gradually taken over by squadrons flying Lockheed AC-130 gunships, and the A-26 aircraft were phased out of active service by November 1969. By the time the last four surviving A-26s were withdrawn at the unit stand down, the squadron had flown 7,159 combat missions, and been credited with destroying 4,268 enemy supply trucks.

The 609th was inactivated on 1 December 1969. The squadron's losses had been heavy, and it was awarded the Presidential Unit Citation for gallantry.

The remains of two squadron pilots, Maj. James E. Sizemore and Maj. Howard V. Andre, shot down over Laos in 1969, were recovered in 2013 and buried at Arlington National Cemetery

Lineage
 349th Night Fighter Squadron
 Constituted as the 349th Night Fighter Squadron on 1 October 1942
 Activated on 4 October 1942
 Disbanded on 31 March 1944
 Reconstituted on 19 September 1985 and consolidated with the 609th Special Operations Squadron

 329th Transport Squadron
 Constituted as the 329th Transport Squadron (Cargo & Mail), Light on 12 May 1944
 Activated on 31 May 1944
 Inactivated on 9 September 1945
 Disbanded on 8 October 1948
 Reconstituted on 19 September 1985 and consolidated with the 609th Special Operations Squadron

 609th Special Operations Squadron
 Constituted as the 609th Air Commando Squadron on 22 August 1967 and activated  (not organized)
 Organized on 15 September 1967
 Redesignated 609th Special Operations Squadron on 1 August 1968
 Inactivated on 1 December 1969

Assignments
 Fighter Command School, 4 October 1942
 Army Air Forces School of Applied Tactics, 21 January 1943
 481st Night Fighter Operational Training Group, 26 July 1943
 Fourth Air Force, 15 January 1944 – 31 March 1944
 Mediterranean Air Transport Service, 31 May 1944 – 9 September 1945
 Pacific Air Forces, 22 August 1967 (not organized)
 56th Air Commando Wing (later 56th Special Operations Wing), 15 September 1967 - 1 December 1969.

Stations
 Kissimmee Army Air Field, Florida, 4 October 1942
 Hammer Field, California, 15 January - 31 March 1944
 Capodichino Airport, Naples, Italy, 31 May 1944 - 9 September 1945
 Nakhon Phanom Royal Thai Navy Base, Thailand, 15 September 1967 - 1 December 1969

Commanders

 Lt Col William R. Yancey, January 1943-31 March 1944
 Maj James E. Scoggins Jr., 31 May 1944
 Capt William E. Gedecke, c. June 1944
 Capt Bernard J. Weist, 24 August 1944 - unknown
  Lt Col Allen F. Learmonth, 15 September 1967
 Lt Col Robert E. Brumm, by 31 March 1968
 Lt Col John J. Shippey, by 30 September 1968
 Lt Col Robert L. Schultz, by 31 December 1968
 Lt Col Robert W. Stout, by 30 September 1969
 Lt Col Jackie R. Douglas, by 30 October 1969 – 1 December 1969

Aircraft

 Douglas DB-7, 1942
 L-6, 1942–1943
 Northrop P-61 Black Widow, 1942–1944
 Douglas P-70 Havoc, 1942–1944
 Boeing B-17 Flying Fortress, 1944–1945
 North American B-25 Mitchell, 1944–1945
 Douglas C-47 Skytrain, 1944–1945
 Douglas C-53 Skytrooper, 1944–1945
 Douglas A-26 Invader, 1967-1969.

Awards and Campaigns

Decorations

References

Notes

Bibliography

External links
609th Special Operations Squadron veteran's website

609
1942 establishments in Florida
1969 disestablishments in Thailand